Clova E. Court (née Cameron; born 10 February 1960) is a retired English athlete, who competed mainly in the heptathlon and the 100 metres hurdles. She represented Great Britain in the heptathlon at the 1992 Olympic Games in Barcelona. She won a record five AAA Championships heptathlon tiles, and also won the 1994 AAAs Championship 100 metres hurdles title, defeating Sally Gunnell.

Career
Born in Saint Catherine Parish, Jamaica, Court competed for Great Britain at several major championships during the 1990s. Her first individual international vest was at the age of 30. She finished sixteenth at the 1991 World Championships with a personal best score of 6022 points, ninth at the 1992 European Indoor Championships, nineteenth at the 1992 Summer Olympics and eighth at the 1998 Commonwealth Games.

Court also competed in hurdling, and reached the semifinals at the 1993 World Indoor Championships and the 1993 World Championships. Her personal best time was 13.04 seconds, achieved at the 1994 European Championships in Helsinki. She made the final at the 1994 Commonwealth Games, but did not finish the race. In all, Court competed in 12 major events, on two occasions doubling up in both the heptathlon and 100m hurdles, and five European cups.

Court represented Great Britain at international level in a number of different disciplines: heptathlon, 100 m hurdles, 200 metres, Javelin throw, Long jump, sprint relay team, plus indoor 60 m hurdles, pentathlon, and 4 × 200 m relay team. In total, she made 57 appearances for the United Kingdom. She is one of the few  former Olympians who has captained a British team, and then gone on to manage and coach a British team.

International competitions
5 EUROPEAN CUP  TEAM CHAMPIONSHIPS 1991/1992/1993/1997/1998 winning individual title in 1993 and 4th place in 1993

National titles
5 AAA Championships heptathlon titles (1991, 1992, 1993, 1997 & 1998)
1 AAAs Championship 100 metres hurdles title (1994)
2 AAAs Indoor Championship 60 metres hurdles titles (1993 & 1995)
2 inter counties titles 1987 & 1997
British athletics federation indoor champion 60m hurdles 1996

References

External links
gbrathletics

1960 births
Living people
People from Saint Catherine Parish
British female hurdlers
English female hurdlers
British heptathletes
English heptathletes
Olympic athletes of Great Britain
Athletes (track and field) at the 1992 Summer Olympics
Commonwealth Games competitors for England
Athletes (track and field) at the 1994 Commonwealth Games
Athletes (track and field) at the 1998 Commonwealth Games
World Athletics Championships athletes for Great Britain
Jamaican emigrants to the United Kingdom